is a train station in Moji ward of Kitakyushu, Fukuoka Prefecture, Japan. It is on the Mojikō Retro Scenic Line, a heritage railway operated by the Heisei Chikuhō Railway. It is the northernmost train station in Kyushu.

The station name is derived from its position next to the Kanmon Straits and that it's within .

Overview
Only a single four-car passenger train named the  serves this station, operating between March and November. Except for certain weeks, trains only operate on the weekends and holidays. Eleven round-trip services are run per day at 40-minute intervals.

External links
Kanmonkaikyō Mekari Station (Mojikō Retro Scenic Line website)

References

Railway stations in Fukuoka Prefecture
Railway stations in Japan opened in 2009
Mojikō Retro Scenic Line